When the king enjoys his own again (sometimes known as The king shall enjoy his own again) is a Cavalier ballad written by Martin Parker during the English Civil War (first published in 1643). It was later adopted by Jacobites. According to the historian Dr. Bernard Capp, this song was perhaps the most popular song in mid-seventeenth century England. The eighteenth century critic Joseph Ritson called it "the most famous and popular air ever heard in this country".

Jacobite usage
One of the Irish Jacobite regiments formed in the 1690s from veterans of James II's Irish campaign, the Régiment Rooth (nicknamed 'the Pretender's body-guard'), marched to ‘When the king enjoys his own again’. Upon Queen Mary II's death in 1694, Bristol Jacobites publicly rejoiced with bell-ringings and danced through the streets to the song. In September 1711 a commander of a company of London militia, Captain John Silk, had his trained bands march to the song through the City. In 1713 the Tory clergyman Henry Sacheverell preached to the Sons of the Clergy and afterwards attended a gathering with (amongst others) Dr. Bisse (the Bishop of Hereford) and Francis Atterbury (the Bishop of Rochester). The song was played by the musicians and met with such a favourable reception that it was repeated and when the musicians tried to play a different song they were met with great hissing.

After the accession of the first Hanoverian king, George I, there was a resurgence of Jacobitism in the form of celebrating Charles II's Restoration Day (29 May). On that day in 1715 Bristol Jacobites were heard humming the tune. At Oxford on Restoration Day in 1716 local Jacobite gownsmen disrupted attempted Whig celebrations of it by playing the tune. According to the historian Daniel Szechi, this was the most popular Jacobite song of the period.

In February 1716 two Exeter College, Oxford undergraduates were beaten by officers for playing the song.

In 1722 in St Albans the future MP for the town, Thomas Gape, had musicians play the song during an election riot.

On 23 February 1748, the birthday of the Pretender's youngest son, two Oxford University undergraduates (James Dawes of St Mary Hall and John Whitmore of Balliol College) openly declared for the Pretender, for which they were charged with uttering treason and given bail. However, in October the pair toured Oxford's colleges with two musicians who played ‘When the king enjoys his own again’ and they were subsequently expelled, fined and sentenced to two years' imprisonment.

Lyrics

Notes

Further reading
William Wagstaffe, The Ballad of The king shall enjoy his own again: with a learned comment thereupon, at the request of Capt. Silk (London, 1711).

Jacobite songs
17th-century songs
English patriotic songs